Die Türen ("the doors") are a Berlin-based German pop band founded in 2002. The band's lyrics are noted for offbeat laconic humour.

Discography
2004: Das Herz war Nihilismus  
2005: Unterwegs mit Mother Earth
2007: Popo
2008: Booty
2012: ABCDEFGHIJKLMNOPQRSTUVWXYZ
2012: Das Cover Album
2014: Wir sind der Mann (as Der Mann)
2015: Ich bin ein Mann
2016: Der Spielmacher
2019: Exoterik

References

External links
Official website

German musical groups